Nam-gu is a non-autonomous district in the City of Pohang in North Gyeongsang Province, South Korea. Its name literally means "South District" as it is one of two districts in the city, the other being Buk-gu or "North District".

Administrative divisions 

Nam-gu is divided into 3 towns (eup), 4 townships (myeon), and 7 neighbourhoods (dong).

Each town and township are then further divided into numerous villages (ri).

See also 
 Buk-gu, Pohang

References

External links 
  

Districts of Pohang